Dmitrii Mihailovich Ialin (born 9 August 1998) is a Russian pair skater. With his former skating partner, Polina Kostiukovich, he is the 2018 World Junior and the 2018–19 Junior Grand Prix Final silver medalist, and the 2019 World Junior bronze medalist. He is also the 2017 JGP Croatia and the 2018 JGP Austria champion.

Career

Early years 
Ialin began learning to skate in 2002. He trained as a single skater until 2013 in Yekaterinburg. He later switched to pair skating and moved to Saint Petersburg.

Ialin and Polina Kostiukovich began competing together in 2016. They were coached by Vasili Velikov in Saint Petersburg.

2017–2018 season: Silver at Junior Worlds 

Kostiukovich/Ialin made their international debut in late September 2017 at the Junior Grand Prix (JGP) competition in Zagreb, Croatia, where they won the gold medal. They beat the silver medalist, Gao Yumeng / Xie Zhong, by less than one point and the bronze medalist, their teammates Aleksandra Boikova / Dmitrii Kozlovskii, by about two points. At this competition Kostiukovich/Ialin performed a level 3 quad twist which is rarely seen even at senior competitions. They received 10.46 points for that twist.

In January 2018 Kostiukovich/Ialin won the bronze medal at the 2018 Russian Junior Championships after placing eleventh in the short program and second in the free skate. 

In March 2018 Kostiukovich/Ialin competed at the 2018 Junior Worlds where they won the silver medal after placing second in the short program and third in the free skate. They were part of a Russian sweep of the pairs' podium, along with their training partners Anastasia Mishina / Aleksandr Galliamov (bronze) and Daria Pavliuchenko / Denis Khodykin (gold).

2018–2019 season: Bronze at Junior Worlds 

Kostiukovich/Ialin started their season by competing in the 2018 Junior Grand Prix series. At their first Junior Grand Prix event of the season they won the gold medal in Linz, Austria. They were ranked first in both the short program and the free skate and won the gold medal by a margin of more than 14 points over the silver medalist, their teammates Anastasia Poluianova / Dmitry Sopot. At their second JGP event of the season they won the silver medal in Ostrava, Czech Republic. They were ranked first in the short program and second in the free skate, and were beaten by the gold medalists, their teammates and training partners Kseniia Akhanteva / Valerii Kolesov by a margin of about 4 points. At this event they set the junior-level pairs' record for the short program (66.30 points). With these results they qualified for the 2018–19 Junior Grand Prix Final.

At the JGP Final, Kostiukovich/Ialin won the silver medal after placing first in the short program and second in the free skate. They were part of a Russian sweep of the pairs' podium. Kostiukovich/Ialin beat the bronze medalists, Apollinariia Panfilova / Dmitry Rylov, by about 3 points but the race for the gold medal were really tight. The gold medalists, their training partners Mishina/Galliamov, beat Kostiukovich/Ialin by a margin of only 1.1 point. At this event Kostiukovich/Ialin scored their personal best score of 189.53 points and they also upgraded their junior-level pairs' record for the short program (66.84 points).

At the 2019 Russian Championships, Kostiukovich/Ialin placed eighth in the senior event and second in the junior event, and were assigned to the 2019 World Junior Championships alongside Mishina/Galliamov and Panfilova/Rylov.  They won the short program at Junior Worlds, narrowly ahead of both of the other Russian teams, and were awarded a gold small medal for the result.  In the free skate, they had underrotations called on their combination jump and Kostiukovich fell on a throw triple Salchow.  As a result, they finished third in the free skate and third overall.  Ialin admitted "unfortunately, not everything worked out today."  Kostiukovich expressed the hope that "at our next Junior World Championships we can improve, fix our mistakes, and gain experience to be able to win."

2019-2020 season 
Kostiukovich/Ialin were assigned to the ISU JGP Croatia Cup 2019, in Zagreb, Croatia and they missed the events. 

Competing at the 2020 Russian Championships at the senior level, they placed eighth. Kostiukovich/Ialin have qualified junior championships as well.

Programs

With Kostiukovich

Records and achievements 
(with Ialin)
 
 Set the junior-level pairs' record of the new +5 / -5 GOE (Grade of Execution) system for the short program (66.30 points) at the 2018 JGP Czech Republic.

 Upgraded their junior-level pairs' record for the short program (66.84 points) at the 2018–19 JGP Final.

 Upgraded their junior-level pairs' record for the short program (68.31 points) at the 2019 World Junior Championships.

Competitive highlights 
JGP: Junior Grand Prix

With Kostiukovich

Detailed results 
Small medals for short and free programs awarded only at ISU Championships.

With Kostiukovich

References

External links 

 

! colspan="3" style="border-top: 5px solid #78FF78;" |World Junior Record Holders

1998 births
Russian male pair skaters
World Junior Figure Skating Championships medalists
Living people
Sportspeople from Yekaterinburg